Ziyād al-Aʿd̲j̲am was an Arabic poet of the Umayyad period. Of Persian origin, he was a mawla of the Amir b. al-Harith, a branch of the Abd al-Kays. Ziyād owed his nickname, "al-Aʿd̲j̲am," to his strong Persian accent. According to anecdotes told in the Aghani, his grammar and pronunciation of spoken Arabic was not ideal.

References 

8th-century Iranian people
Persian Arabic-language poets
Persian-language poets
Poets from the Umayyad Caliphate
Slaves from the Umayyad Caliphate